In chemistry, melem is a compound with formula ; specifically, 2,5,8-triamino-heptazine or 2,5,8-triamino-tri-s-triazine, whose molecule can be described as that of heptazine with the three hydrogen atoms replaced by amino groups. It is a white crystalline solid.

Preparation
Melem can be prepared by thermal decomposition of various C−N−H compounds, such as melamine C3N3(NH2)3, dicyandiamide H4C2N4, ammonium dicyanamide NH4[N(CN)2], cyanamide H2CN2, at 400 to 450 °C.

Structure and properties

Crystal structure
Melem crystallizes in the group P21/c (No. 14), with parameters a = 739.92(1) pm, b = 865.28(3) pm, c = 1338.16(4) pm, β = 99.912(2)°, and Z = 4. The almost-planar molecules are arranged in parallel layers spaced 327 pm apart.  The molecule is in the triamino form, rather than one of the possible tautomers.

Thermal decomposition
When heated above 560°, melem transforms into a graphite-like C−N material.

Melemium cations
Melem accepts up to three protons yielding cations called melemium . Some salts described in the literature are melemium sulfate,  • 2, melemium perchlorate,  • , melemium hydrogensulfate  and two melemium methylsulfonates  •  and  • . The protons can be inserted in any of the six outer nitrogen atoms of the heptazine core, yielding many tautomers of apparently similar energies.

See also

 Triazine , with a single C-N ring
 Melamine , triamino triazine
 Melaminium , a cation derived from melamine
 Melam , a condensation dimer of melamine
 Melamium , a cation derived from melam
 Melon , a condensation oligomer of melem

References

Heterocyclic compounds with 3 rings
Nitrogen heterocycles
Tricyclic compounds
Amines